Bílsko u Hořic is a municipality and village in Jičín District in the Hradec Králové Region of the Czech Republic. It has about 100 inhabitants.

Notable people
Jan Rys-Rozsévač (1901–1946), journalist and politician

References

Villages in Jičín District